Joseph Connor (born 1 February 1986) is an English footballer who plays as a midfielder.

Career

College
Connor came from his native England to the United States in 2004, where he subsequently played four years of college soccer at Lee University. He was named to the All-Conference Southern Athletic Conference team as a junior in 2006.

Professional
Connor signed with Charlotte Eagles out of college in 2008, and made his professional debut on 8 August 2008, as a second-half substitute in a game against Cleveland City Stars.

In December 2011 he joined Stockport County on non-contract basis, a club both his father and grandfather had played for, he made his debut against Alfreton Town on 17 December 2011 and kept a clean sheet in a 0–0 draw.

Joe's first goal came in a 3–2 home win against Barrow on 1 January 2012. His second goal wasn't too long after in a 2–2 draw away at Braintree Town. The performances of Connor impressed manager Jim Gannon enough to offer Connor a contract until the end of the season. He was offered a further one-year contract by the club in May 2012.

Connor joined Football Conference side Macclesfield Town in June 2013, and within 10 games had established himself as a centre back in the first team.

In July 2015, Connor signed on to play for Ashton United of the Northern Premier League Premier Division.

Personal life
His father Jim and grandfather Jack also played for Stockport County.

References

External links
 
 
 Charlotte Eagles bio
 USL Pro

1986 births
Living people
English footballers
English expatriate footballers
Association football defenders
Fort Wayne Fever players
Charlotte Eagles players
Stockport County F.C. players
Hereford United F.C. players
Macclesfield Town F.C. players
USL League Two players
USL Second Division players
National League (English football) players
Footballers from Stockport
Expatriate soccer players in the United States
Ashton United F.C. players
Southport F.C. players
USL Championship players
English expatriate sportspeople in the United States